Malimba may refer to:

Limba people (Cameroon)
Malimba language of Cameroon
Malimba, Gabon
In East and Southeast Africa, a musical instrument analogous to either a marimba or a mbira